The 2012–13 Angola men's basketball cup was contested by 13 teams and ran from February 3 to April 19, 2013, whereas the four-team women's tournament ran from January 22 to February 2.

2013 Angola men's basketball cup
The 2013 men's basketball cup was contested by 13 teams and won by Petro Atlético, thus dethroning Primeiro de Agosto. The 2-leg final was played on April 16 and 19, with Petro winning with a 2–0 record.

Preliminary rounds

Final round

Final

2013 Angola women's basketball cup
The 2013 women's cup was contested by four teams, with the 2-leg cup finals decided by playoff, with Interclube winning the title.

Preliminary stage

Day 1

Day 2

Day 3

Knockout stage

Preliminary stage

Knockout stage

See also
 2013 Angola Basketball Super Cup
 2013 BAI Basket
 2013 Victorino Cunha Cup

References

Angola Basketball Cup seasons
Cup